The 1904–05 season was Galatasaray SK's first. Galatasaray SK did not join the IFL.

Squad statistics

Friendly Matches

Kick-off listed in local time (EEST)

References

External links
 Galatasaray Sports Club Official Website 
 Turkish Football Federation - Galatasaray A.Ş. 
 uefa.com - Galatasaray AŞ

Galatasaray S.K. (football) seasons
Turkish football clubs 1904–05 season
1900s in Istanbul